A dividing train is a passenger train that separates into two trains partway along its route, so as to serve two destinations. Inversely, two trains from different origins may be coupled together mid-route to reach a common endpoint. Trains on complex routes may divide or couple multiple times. The general term for coupling two or more trains along their shared route sections is portion working.

On the eastbound trip, trains from Portland and Seattle are coupled at Spokane before traveling as one train to Chicago.

Dividing trains are useful where line capacity is limited, allowing multiple trains to use the same path over a congested part of a network. The common sections will often be the busiest parts of the routes.

Operation

On the initial leg of its journey, the train is driven as normal by a single crew.  At a designated station before a junction, the train stops and some of the cars are detached, with passengers or goods still on board.  The front part of the train then departs to run the remainder of its route.  A second train is then formed from the detached cars, the points are changed at the junction, and a new crew drives the train on a different route to a second destination.  Where the train is formed of multiple units – self-contained trainsets with their own propulsion and driving cabs – two or more units work in multiple on the first leg.  After detachment, the second crew drives in the trailing unit's front cab.

On the return journey, the two trains may join at the same station where they divided.  Special signalling is required at the station, both to recognise the division of the outbound train as intentional, and to allow the two inbound trains to enter the same block.  The British rail network uses a draw ahead signal for the latter.

Possible combinations
A variety of portion working combinations is possible.  For example:
 Two trains may each depart from separate termini, be coupled together en route, and arrive at their single destination together.
 Vice versa, a pair of trains may depart together from the same terminus, be separated en route, and then continue to separate destinations.
 Two trains may each depart from separate termini, be coupled together, and later separated, en route, and then continue to separate destinations.
 A train may depart from a terminus, be coupled en route to another train departing from the point where the coupling occurs, and then the two trains will continue together to their single destination, thus providing a longer train for a busier portion of the route (or vice versa).
 A train may depart from a terminus, and divide at a station en route, with both portions then continuing to the same destination, but the first running an express stopping pattern, and the second part stopping more frequently. In the reverse of this, the second portion is the faster of the two, catching up the slow train at the point where they join.

Issues
For portion working to be successful, the operator may need to address many issues.  For example:

 Locations for coupling and uncoupling must be designated.
 The best combinations of services must be carefully considered.
 Coupling and uncoupling takes time.
 Portion working can transfer disruption from one section to the wider network.

Dividing trains can sometimes cause issues for unwary travellers, who may board the wrong car and thus arrive at an unexpected destination.

Examples

Australia

Belgium 
 IC trains between Genk and Knokke or Blankenberge (IC 1527–1542) used to be divided in Bruges, the front part went to Knokke (IC 1627–1642) while the rest continued to Blankenberge and the same occurred on the return leg (IC 1505–1520). The consists were either made up with AM96 EMU's (enable passage from set coach to another) or M6 coaches hauled by Class 19 locomotives. In the latter case, cab cars and engines are fitted with automatic couplers to allow quick separation. On periods with high affluence or when facing problems, these IC trains could run entirely to one destination (usually Blankenberghe) and another trainset was be provided for the leg between Bruges and Knokke. This dual service ended with the new transport timetable introduced in December 2017. Now, separate trains are used for each destination.
 despite not being advertised as coupling trains, some IC trains between Lille Flandres and Tournai are then coupled with one or two AM96 trainsets going from Tournai or Kortrijk to Namur, therefore allowing to travel directly from Lille to Namur.
 The same happens with IC trains Between Lille Flandres and Mouscron. At Mouscron, they are coupled with AM96 multiple units which then run IC trains between Mouscron and Antwerp Centraal.

Canada

Germany 
 There are several dividing regional and high-speed trains all over Germany. ICE trains from Munich often split at Hanover into sections for Bremen and for Hamburg. ICE from Berlin split at Hamm into sections for Cologne and for Düsseldorf.
 Munich S-Bahn: Line S1 serves both Freising and Munich Airport by splitting at Neufahrn bei Freising station
 Hanover Stadtbahn: In the evenings and on Sundays the lines 2 and 8 of Hanover's light rail system work with dividing trains. Trains start in Alte Heide as line 2 and divide in Peiner Straße stop. One part continues as line 8 to Messe Nord, the other as line 2 to Rethen. In the other direction, trains reconnect at Bothmerstraße station and run as line 2 to Alte Heide.
 Hamburg S-Bahn: The trains on the line S1 of Hamburg's S-Bahn system usually split at Ohlsdorf into sections for Hamburg Airport and for Poppenbüttel.
 Since 2014, the Regional-Express services RE 1 Mannheim–Saarbrücken–Trier–Koblenz and RE 11 Luxembourg City–Trier–Koblenz operate jointly with trains dividing in Trier main station. The RE 1 part is operated by the German DB Regio South-West with a Stadler FLIRT single-deck EMU as part of the Süwex network, while the RE 11 part is operated by the Luxembourgish Société Nationale des Chemins de Fer Luxembourgeois with a double-deck Stadler KISS EMU. This is probably the only situation where a single-deck and a double-deck train of two countries' national railways divide
 Since 2018, the Regional-Express service RE 7 Hamburg–Elmshorn–Neumünster–Kiel/Flensburg is split in Neumünster with the front train continuing to Kiel, the rear to Flensburg.

Japan 
There are several dividing train services in Japan, and each route has its own name.

United Kingdom
The practice of portion working has been followed for a long time on the third rail network of lines in the South East of England, and has been more widely practised in continental Europe. Elsewhere in the United Kingdom, the practice has been less common, because of a general reluctance to design the necessary modern signalling systems, and because of legal constraints on competition between operators.

Dividing trains operate on several lines on the British railway network, commonly (although not exclusively) in the south of the country. To ensure consistent journey times, the front part of a dividing train usually becomes the rear of the returning service when it reunites.

In addition, some services discard carriages part-way along the route, & pick them back up on the return journey. This may be because a portion of the line has short platforms at a number of its stations, or because of demand being much higher on one section than another.

United States

See also

 Interchange
 Slip coach
 Through coach
 Sections in North America
 Express train

References

Rail transport operations
Passenger rail transport